Tang Pui Wah (born 11 October 1933) is a Singaporean former sprinter. She competed in the women's 100 metres and women's 80 metres hurdles at the 1952 Summer Olympics. She is the first Singaporean female athlete to compete in the Olympic Games. She retired from athletics in 1955, at 22 years of age.

Tang was admitted after the Second World War to Nanyang Girls’ High School and later Raffles Girls’ School. Tang was inducted into the Singapore Women's Hall of Fame in 2014 in the category of "Sports".

References

External links
 

1933 births
Living people
Athletes (track and field) at the 1952 Summer Olympics
Singaporean female sprinters
Olympic athletes of Singapore
Place of birth missing (living people)
Athletes (track and field) at the 1954 Asian Games
Medalists at the 1954 Asian Games
Asian Games medalists in athletics (track and field)
Asian Games bronze medalists for Singapore
Raffles Girls' Secondary School alumni
20th-century Singaporean women